Rhinella cristinae is a species of toad in the family Bufonidae.
It is found in La Pedrera, Amazonas Province, Colombia and possibly Brazil.
Its natural habitats are subtropical or tropical moist lowland forests and rivers. It is named for Colombian amphibian collector and colleague of the discoverers, Cristina Ardila-Robayo.

References

cristinae
Amphibians of Colombia
Endemic fauna of Colombia
Amphibians described in 2002
Taxonomy articles created by Polbot